Jean-Louis Crémieux-Brilhac CBE (22 January 1917 – 8 April 2015) was a French journalist, a member of the French resistance and a historian. During World War II he directed the Free French propaganda radio broadcasts to Europe. After the war he helped create France's state-owned publishing house, La Documentation Française.

Early life
Crémieux was born to a middle class Jewish family in the Colombes suburb of Paris. His political awareness was raised in high school by his uncle Benjamin Crémieux (1888-1944), a literary critic. Through his uncle, Crémieux met and was influenced by the anti-authoritarian surrealism of André Malraux and the liberal internationalism of Stefan Zweig.   He graduated from the Lycée Condorcet in 1933. But it was first during a school vacation in 1931 that he visited Germany and in subsequent trips saw first-hand the work of the Nazi Party. In 1935 he joined, and became the youngest member of the Comité de vigilance des intellectuels antifascistes (CVIA) which spearheaded the unification of left-wing politics in France.

During the Second World War he served as General Charles de Gaulle's 'propaganda chief in London'.

Honours 
2016: Knight Grand Cross in the Legion of Honour.

Notes and references

Further reading

External links
Jean-Louis Crémieux-Brilhac in The Guardian
Cremieux-Brilhac: A farewell to France's war broadcaster at BBC News

1917 births
2015 deaths
People from Colombes
French Resistance members
20th-century French historians
Lycée Condorcet alumni
Grand Croix of the Légion d'honneur
Officiers of the Ordre des Arts et des Lettres
Commanders of the Order of the British Empire
Recipients of the Resistance Medal
Recipients of the Croix de Guerre 1939–1945 (France)